Fort Frances is a town in, and the seat of, Rainy River District in Northwestern Ontario, Canada. The population as of the 2016 census was 7,739. Fort Frances is a popular fishing destination. It hosts the annual Fort Frances Canadian Bass Championship.

Located on the international border with the United States where Rainy Lake narrows to become Rainy River, it is connected to International Falls, Minnesota by the Fort Frances–International Falls International Bridge. The town is the fourth-largest community in Northwestern Ontario after Thunder Bay, Kenora and Dryden. The Fort Frances Paper Mill was formerly the main employer and industry in the town until its closure in January 2014. New Gold, a Canadian mining company, acquired mineral rights to the area in 2013. The Rainy River mine commenced processing ore on September 14, 2017 and completed its first gold pour on October 5, 2017.

History

Fort Frances was the first European settlement west of Lake Superior and was established by French Canadian Pierre Gaultier de Varennes, sieur de La Vérendrye, first commander of the western district. In 1731, he built Fort Saint Pierre near that spot as support for the fur trade with native peoples. In 1732, his expedition built Fort Saint Charles on Magnuson's Island on the west side of Lake of the Woods. After some time, Fort Saint Pierre fell out of use.

In 1817, following the War of 1812 and the redefinition of borders between Canada and the United States, the Hudson's Bay Company (HBC) built a fort here. In 1830 HBC Chief Factor John Dugald Cameron named the fur trading post after Frances Ramsay Simpson, the 18-year-old daughter of a London merchant, who had married earlier that year in London, George Simpson, Governor of the Hudson's Bay Company, who would visit the fort many times. In 1841 she became Lady Simpson after George Simpson was knighted, and she died in 1853 at Lachine, Quebec.

Incorporated in 1903, the town held a big centennial celebration in 2003.

The main employer was a pulp and paper mill established in the early 1900s. It had numerous owners over the years, notably Edward Wellington Backus. Most recently owned by Resolute Forest Products, the mill employed about 700 persons until its closure in 2014.

On June 25, 1946, the town was struck by a tornado, which caused major damage and struck a week after the deadly Windsor tornado.

On August 25, 2013, the town hosted the final pitstop in the Kraft Celebration Tour by receiving the most votes out of all 20 communities

On January 14, 2014, Resolute Forest Products announced that it planned to stop operations of the final paper machine and close out its operations in Fort Frances by the end of the month.

On December 13, 2014, Tim Hortons filmed a commercial in Fort Frances. The commercial, which dubs Fort Frances "one of the coldest places in Canada", was shot at the local Tim Hortons. In the days leading up to the filming, yarn was seen covering trees, benches, etc. Workers had spent the night covering the interior of the restaurant with yarn and building a giant toque on the roof. For the day, the coffee was free.

In August 2015 the Seven Generations Education Institute hosted the World Indigenous Nations Higher Education Consortium's (WINHEC) Annual General Meeting at the Nanicost Grounds for members attending from all over the world.

Transportation

There are three airports in the area, one of which is in the United States. The two local airports are for general aviation and other is a privately owned floatplane base.

Fort Frances Municipal Airport
Fort Frances Water Aerodrome
Falls International Airport

Fort Frances Municipal Airport is served by only one company, Bearskin Airlines, with flights to and from Kenora, Winnipeg, Thunder Bay, and Dryden. Falls International Airport has flights to Minneapolis–Saint Paul by Delta Connection.

Ontario Highway 11 and Ontario Highway 71, the latter of which ends in Fort Frances, are the two major highways in the community. Both are part of the Trans-Canada Highway. The town is connected to Kenora via Highway 71, while Highway 11 provides connections to Devlin, Emo, and Rainy River to the west, and Atikokan and Thunder Bay to the east.

Canadian National Railway travels into Fort Frances with freight traffic only and travels across the Fort Frances-International Falls International Bridge, over the Rainy River, into the US.

Train, truck and car traffic to and from the United States traverses the International Bridge.

Fort Frances Transit operated until 1996, and Fort Frances Handi-Van Transit is a provincially-funded service run by the Town of Fort Frances. Caribou Coach Transportation Company Incorporated cancelled its bus route to and from Thunder Bay in October 2017. The route was once served by Greyhound Canada. North Air operates a taxi service from Fort Frances whose service area includes the International Falls, Minnesota area and airport.

Climate
Fort Frances experiences a humid continental climate (Köppen climate classification Dfb), with cold winters and warm summers. Temperatures beyond  have been measured in all five late-spring and summer months. Summer highs are comparable to Paris and the Los Angeles Basin coastline in California, whereas winter lows on average resemble southern Siberia and polar subarctic inland Scandinavia.

Fort Frances, along with Atikokan hold the record for the highest temperature ever recorded in the province of Ontario.

Demographics 

Fort Frances had a population of 7,739 people in 2016, which represents a decrease of 2.7% from the 2011 census count. The median household income in 2015 for Fort Frances was $62,928, which was below the Ontario provincial average of $74,287.

Coat of arms
The city coat of arms features a bull moose; maple leaves; a "Magneto", representative of electricity (industry); two men in a canoe; a white pine tree; and the motto "Industry and Perseverance."

Media

Newspapers
 Fort Frances Times - Weekly
 Fort Frances Today - Weekly
 Fort Frances Living - Weekly
West End Weekly - Weekly

Online media
 NWO Update
 Fort Frances Times Online
 Downtown Fort Frances on the Great Canadian Main Street Facebook page

Television stations
The only local television channel serving Fort Frances is the Shaw TV community channel on Shaw Cable channel 10.

There are no local broadcast outlets or repeaters serving Fort Frances; Shaw Cable carries CBWT-DT (CBC), CBWFT-DT (Ici Radio-Canada Télé) and CKY-DT (CTV) from Winnipeg, CITV-DT (Global) from Edmonton, and TVO, plus CITY-DT (Citytv), CHCH-DT (independent), CFTM-DT (TVA, live feed) and TFO. CJBN-TV from Kenora used to be available on cable until it permanently signed off on January 27, 2017.

United States network programming on Shaw TV comes from Detroit (WDIV-TV, WXYZ-TV, WWJ-TV, and WTVS) and Rochester (WUHF); stations from the Duluth television market are not available on cable, though they are available over-the-air from repeaters in International Falls.

Radio stations
 FM 89.1 - CKSB-9-FM (Ici Radio-Canada Première, repeats CKSB-10-FM, Saint Boniface, Manitoba)
 FM 90.5 - CBQQ-FM (CBC Radio One, repeats CBQT-FM, Thunder Bay)
 FM 93.1 - CFOB-FM, 93.1 The Border FM hot adult contemporary

Another radio station, CKWO FM 92.3 The Wolf, was licensed to the neighbouring Couchiching First Nation. The station closed and went silent in 2007.

Education

Elementary and secondary schools
Rainy River District School Board
Fort Frances High School
Robert Moore School
J.W. Walker School

Northwest Catholic District School Board
St Mary's School

Post-secondary schools
Confederation College
Seven Generations Education Institute

Former elementary schools
Rainy River District School Board
Fort Kinhaven School
F.H. Huffman School
Alexander Mackenzie School
Sixth Street School
Alberton Central School (Alberton, Ontario)
McIrvine School
Old Fort Frances High School
Westfort High School

Northwest Catholic District School Board
St. Michael's Catholic School
St Francis School

Notable Fort Francesians
 Dave Allison, former coach of the NHL's Ottawa Senators
 Mike Allison, former player for the Los Angeles Kings, Toronto Maple Leafs, and New York Rangers of the NHL
 Steve Arpin, ARCA Re/Max Series and NASCAR Nationwide Series race car driver
 Murray Bannerman, former player for the Chicago Blackhawks.
 Molly Carlson, high diver
 Keith Christiansen, former player for the WHA Minnesota Fighting Saints.
 Todd Dufresne, social and cultural theorist best known for his work on Freud and psychoanalysis
 Gene Eugene, actor, musician and recording producer
 Howard Hampton, Member of Provincial Parliament (Ontario) of Kenora—Rainy River (provincial electoral district) and former leader of the Ontario New Democratic Party.
 Duncan Keith, NHL hockey player of the Chicago Blackhawks, named one of the 100 Greatest NHL Players 
 Chris Lindberg, silver medalist with the Canadian Ice Hockey Team at the 1992 Winter Olympics
 Neil Sheehy, former player for the Calgary Flames, Hartford Whalers and Washington Capitals of the NHL.
 Timothy Sheehy, former NHL player.
 Gene Stoltzfus, founding director of Christian Peacemaker Teams

Culture and attractions
The Fort Frances Museum
Fort Frances Library and Technology Centre
The Border Land Arts Alliance
Tour de Fort
Point Park
LaVerendrye Parkway- The Sorting Gap Marina
The Lookout Tower, open to tour during summer
The Tugboat Hallet, open to tour during summer
Fort Frances Canadian Bass Championship, held annually in late July 
Scott Street Shopping District
Kitchen Creek Golf Club
Heron Landing Golf Course
8th Street Walking & Ski Trails 
Little Beaver Snow Park
Rainy Lake Square
Town Hall
Rendezvous Yacht Club 
The Noden Causeway
The Rainy Lake Nordic Ski Club

Sport
Fort Frances is home to the following amateur sports teams:
 Fort Frances Lakers (Junior ice hockey)
 Fort Frances Thunderhawks (Senior ice hockey)

Fort Frances was the home of the former amateur sports teams:
 Fort Frances Borderland Thunder (Junior ice hockey)
 Fort Frances Canadians (Senior ice hockey)
 Fort Frances Royals (Junior ice hockey)

Sporting facilities include :                                                     
 Memorial Sports Centre
 Couchiching First Nations Arena also known as "The Duke" - located in neighboring Couchiching First Nation

Sources

External links

 
1903 establishments in Ontario
Hudson's Bay Company forts
Single-tier municipalities in Ontario
Towns in Ontario